Edwin Chapin Starks (born in Baraboo, Wisconsin on January 25, 1867; died December 29, 1932) was an ichthyologist most associated with Stanford University. He was known as an authority on the osteology of fish. He also did studies of fish of the Puget Sound. His wife and daughter were also both involved in either science or natural history.

See also
:Category:Taxa named by Edwin Chapin Starks

References 

American ichthyologists
Stanford University Department of Biology faculty
Stanford University alumni
1867 births
1932 deaths
People from Baraboo, Wisconsin